2006 FAM League is the 55th edition season of current third-tier league competition in Malaysia.

The league winner for 2006 season was Pasir Gudang United F.C.

Teams

The following teams participated in the Malaysia FAM Cup 2006. In order by the number given by FAM:

  ATM FA
  Johor Linkedua 
  MBJB F.C.
  MP Muar F.C.
  Pasir Gudang United F.C.
  SAJ FC  
  Kuala Muda Naza F.C.
  Kuala Lumpur Maju United FC 
  PLUS FC
  KL Kesas FC
  Perak Dewan Bandaraya Ipoh (DB Ipoh) / DBI
  PP Kampung Seronok FC
  MPSJ FC
  Proton FC  
  SUKSES FC

Team summaries

Stadia

League table

Pld = Matches played; W = Matches won; D = Matches drawn; L = Matches lost; F = Goals for; A = Goals against; GD = Goal difference; Pts = Points

References

3
2006